Endroyi is a village in Guntur district of the Indian state of Andhra Pradesh. It is located in Amaravathi mandal of Guntur revenue division. The village forms a part of Andhra Pradesh Capital Region, under the jurisdiction of APCRDA.

Geography 

Demographics 

 Census of India, Endroyi had a population of 2,703. The total population constitutes 1,358 males and 1,345 females —a sex ratio of 990 females per 1000 males. 263 children are in the age group of 0–6 years, with child sex ratio of 1071 girls per 1000 boys. The average literacy rate stands at 62.50% with 1,525 literates.

Government and politics 

Endroyi Gram Panchayat is the local self-government of the village. There are wards, each represented by an elected ward member. The present sarpanch is vacant, elected by the ward members. The village is administered by the  Amaravathi Mandal Parishad at the intermediate level of panchayat raj institutions.

Education 

As per the school information report for the academic year 2018–19, the village has a total of 3 schools. These schools include 2 MPP and one private school.

See also 
List of villages in Guntur district

References 

Villages in Guntur district